Krasnogvardeysky (masculine), Krasnogvardeyskaya (feminine), or Krasnogvardeyskoye (neuter) is the name of several rural localities in Russia:
Krasnogvardeysky, Altai Krai, a settlement in Cherepanovsky Selsoviet of Zmeinogorsky District of Altai Krai
Krasnogvardeysky, Ryazan Oblast, a settlement in Mosolovsky Rural Okrug of Shilovsky District of Ryazan Oblast
Krasnogvardeysky, Artyomovsky District, Sverdlovsk Oblast, a settlement in Artyomovsky District of Sverdlovsk Oblast
Krasnogvardeysky, Beryozovsky, Sverdlovsk Oblast, a settlement under the administrative jurisdiction of the town of Beryozovsky, Sverdlovsk Oblast
Krasnogvardeysky, Tula Oblast, a settlement in Bolshekalmyksky Rural Okrug of Kireyevsky District of Tula Oblast
Krasnogvardeysky, Vladimir Oblast, a settlement in Suzdalsky District of Vladimir Oblast
Krasnogvardeyskoye, Republic of Adygea, a selo in Krasnogvardeysky District of the Republic of Adygea
Krasnogvardeyskoye, Stavropol Krai, a selo in Krasnogvardeysky District of Stavropol Krai

Historic names
Krasnogvardeyskoye, the name of the town of Biryuch, Belgorod Oblast in 1958–2007